"" ("Beautiful Rwanda") has been the national anthem of Rwanda since January 1, 2002.  It replaced "", which had been the national anthem since 1962.

Background
Rwanda's original national anthem, written when the country achieved independence from Belgium in 1962, was called "Rwanda Rwacu" ("Our Rwanda"). Independence was achieved at a time of high tension, following the Rwandan Revolution: centuries of rule by the minority Tutsi group had been overturned in just three years, the majority Hutu taking power in a violent upheaval, and forcing more than 100,000 to seek refuge in neighbouring countries. The subsequent thirty years, under the presidencies of Grégoire Kayibanda and Juvénal Habyarimana, were marked by continued cycles of violence, culminating in the 1990s with the launch of the Rwandan Civil War by exiled Tutsi led by Paul Kagame, the assassination of President Habyarimana, and the 1994 Rwandan genocide, in which between 500,000 and 1,000,000 Tutsi and politically moderate Hutu were killed by Hutu extremists, on the orders of the interim government, in the space of just 100 days.

The genocide was ended when Kagame's rebel army took control of the country in July 1994. A period of "reconciliation" began, as a unity government took control of the country. Kagame was the de facto leader from this point on, and assumed the presidency in 2000. As part of this effort, and ostensibly to signal a break with the country's violent past, the government enacted an overhaul of the country's symbols, including the flag, the coat of arms and the national anthem. However, some Rwandans at the time expressed doubts about the stated reasoning and merely viewed all this as an attempt by the ruling Rwandan Patriotic Front to assert its political power by changing established state symbols.

History 
To commission the lyrics and music for the new state anthem, the government organized a national contest. "Rwanda Nziza" represented the winning entry, with lyrics composed by Faustin Murigo of Karubanda prison, and melody by Captain Jean-Bosco Hashakaimana of the Rwandan army brass band. "Rwanda Nziza" became the official anthem of Rwanda on 1 January 2002.

Lyrics

Notes

References

Cited works

External links

 Rwanda: Rwanda Nziza - Audio of the national anthem of Rwanda, with information and lyrics (archive link)

National anthems
Rwandan music
National symbols of Rwanda
African anthems
National anthem compositions in G major